Mirror Lake is a lake in Wallowa County, Oregon.

References 

Lakes of Oregon
Lakes of Wallowa County, Oregon